Ramahlwe Mphahlele (born 1 February 1990 in Ga Mphahlele, Limpopo) is a South African association football defender and midfielder who plays for with Premier Soccer League club AmaZulu FC. He formerly played for Mamelodi Sundowns.

References

1990 births
Living people
People from Lepelle-Nkumpi Local Municipality
Northern Sotho people
South African soccer players
Association football defenders
Association football midfielders
Moroka Swallows F.C. players
Mamelodi Sundowns F.C. players
University of Pretoria F.C. players
2019 Africa Cup of Nations players
Kaizer Chiefs F.C. players
South African Premier Division players
South Africa international soccer players
Sportspeople from Limpopo